St Mary's Church, Crich is a Grade I listed parish church in the Church of England in Crich, Derbyshire.

History

The church dates from 1135 and has additions in the 13th, 14th and 15th centuries, with a vestry added in the 20th century.

The church was hit by lightning on 5 February 1945, which caused a fire to start. It was extinguished by local volunteers armed with stirrup pumps.

The church is in a joint parish with All Saints' Church, South Wingfield.

Monuments
Sir William de Wakebridge (c. 1369)
Godfrey Beresford (d. 1513)
John Clay (d. 1633)
German Pole (d. 1588)
German Wheatcroft (d. 1857)

Organ

The church had a pipe organ by William Hill and Son dating from 1913. A specification of the organ can be found on the National Pipe Organ Register.  In 2012 it was up for sale.

See also
Grade I listed churches in Derbyshire
Grade I listed buildings in Derbyshire
Listed buildings in Crich

References

Church of England church buildings in Derbyshire
Grade I listed churches in Derbyshire